Lac-Saint-Charles is a former city in Quebec and is now a district of the Quebec City borough of La Haute-Saint-Charles. The population as of the Canada 2011 Census was 9,886.

It existed from 1946 until being amalgamated into Quebec City in 2002.

Former municipalities in Quebec
Neighbourhoods in Quebec City
Populated places disestablished in 2002